This is a list of episodes of the sixteenth season of The Ellen DeGeneres Show (often stylized as ellen16), which began airing on Tuesday, September 4, 2018.

Episodes

References

External links
 

16
2018 American television seasons
2019 American television seasons